Leith-Ross is a surname. Notable people with the surname include:

Frederick Leith-Ross (1887–1968), British economic adviser
Harry Leith-Ross (1886-1973), British painter
Sylvia Leith-Ross (1884–1980), English anthropologist

See also
Leith (surname)
Ross (surname)

Compound surnames
English-language surnames